The sixth season of The Real Housewives of Potomac, an American reality television series, is broadcast on Bravo. It premiered on July 11, 2021, and is primarily filmed in Potomac, Maryland. Its executive producers are Steven Weinstock, Glenda Hersh, Lauren Eskelin, Lorraine Haughton-Lawson, Thomas Kelly and Andy Cohen. The season focuses on the lives of Gizelle Bryant, Ashley Darby, Robyn Dixon, Karen Huger, Candiace Dillard Bassett, Wendy Osefo and Mia Thornton. Additionally, Askale Davis is featured as a friend of the housewives.

Cast and synopsis
After the show's fifth season concluded, Monique Samuels revealed she would not be returning for the following season. The remaining six ladies all returned along with new housewife Mia Thornton and new friend of the housewives Askale Davis. Filming for the season began in January 2021 and concluded in May of the same year.

The reunion was filmed on October 7, with Nicki Minaj appearing as a guest host for a segment.

 During her appearance at the reunion, Davis sits at the end of the left couch, next to Thornton.
 Minaj replaces Cohen as the host during the fourth segment of the reunion.

Episodes

References

The Real Housewives of Potomac
2021 American television seasons